Pem Tshering (born 10 September 1975), is an archer who internationally represented Bhutan

Tshering competed for Bhutan at the 1992 Summer Olympics in Barcelona, she finished 60th in the individual event, and the Bhutanese women's team finished 17th.

References

External links
 

1975 births
Living people
Olympic archers of Bhutan
Archers at the 1992 Summer Olympics
Bhutanese female archers
Place of birth missing (living people)